The 1993 Copa del Rey was the 57th edition of the Spanish basketball Cup. It was organized by the ACB and was played in A Coruña in the Coliseum between March 4 and 7, 1993.

This edition was played by the 22 teams of the 1992–93 ACB season. The four first qualified teams of the previous season qualified directly to the Final Eight while teams 5 to 8 joined the competition in the third round. In the draw of the first round, two teams received a bye.

First round
Teams #2 played the second leg at home.

|}

Second round

|}

Third round

|}

Final Eight Bracket

Final

MVP of the Tournament: Joe Arlauckas

External links
Boxscores at ACB.com
Linguasport

Copa del Rey de Baloncesto
Copa